Michael Frederick may refer to:
 Michael Frederick (cricketer), Barbadian cricketer
 Michael Frederick (footballer), Australian rules footballer
 Mike Frederick, American football defensive end

See also